Phycita atrisquamella is a moth of the family Pyralidae first described by George Hampson in 1901. It is found in Australia and probably in Sri Lanka.

References

Moths of Asia
Moths of Australia
Moths described in 1901
Phycitini